Le Parc Figueroa Alcorta is a residential complex comprising the Alcorta and Cavia towers.

The towers were designed by the Lanuzzi studio and are under construction in the Palermo neighborhood of Buenos Aires, Argentina. The residential complex is the third of its type the Raghsa Group of Buenos Aires is developing in the city, after Le Parc Residential Tower (1995) and Le Parc Puerto Madero (2006). Raghsa has developed numerous commercial real estate projects in Buenos Aires, as well.

This complex is one in a series of such developments announced in major Argentine cities since the Argentine economy began to recover in 2003 from a serious financial crisis. Following their successful development of three residential towers in their Le Parc Puerto Madero project, Raghsa announced in 2006 the construction of two premier residential buildings on Buenos Aires' upscale Figueroa Alcorta Avenue.

Should DYPSA complete Renoir II to these specifications, the Cavia Tower will be the tallest building in Buenos Aires for just one year. Le Parc Figueroa Alcorta broke ground on the intersection of the Figueroa Alcorta Avenue and Cavia Street. in 2006, joining the development of numerous competing projects, many of them scheduled for completion on or before 2010, the year of the Argentine Bicentennial.

See also 
 List of tallest buildings in South America
 List of tallest buildings in Argentina

References

External links
Le Parc Figueroa Alcorta
Obras Metálicas S. A.
Business For Sale

Buildings and structures in Buenos Aires
Residential buildings completed in 2009
Residential skyscrapers in Argentina